Hilarographa swederiana is a species of moth of the family Tortricidae. It is found in Suriname and Brazil.

References

Moths described in 1791
Hilarographini